Miguel Duffy (1845–1925) was an Argentine landowner, merchant and politician, who served for several periods as Intendant of Carmen de Areco, in the Buenos Aires province.

Biography 

He was born in Carmen de Areco, the son of John Duffy, born in Longford, and Elizabeth Taaffe, born in Westmeath. He was married in the Parish Nuestra Señora del Carmen de Areco to Francisca de Magallanes, daughter of Saturnino Magallanes and María Josefa Sierra, belonging to an old family of the town of Areco. He and his wife were the parents of several children, including Eduardo Duffy, a distinguished rancher and politician who served for several terms as congressman of Córdoba.

His wife was related to María Ceballos Blanco, the wife of Joaquín Canavery, intendant of Areco in 1856–1857.

Duffy was appointed for the first time to occupy the position of mayor of the town of Areco in 1874, being replaced by Baldomero Lamela. He returned to occupy the leadership of the town between 1878 and 1879, 1881–1887 and 1893–1894. 

In 1900, Miguel Duffy founded the town of Wheelwright in General López, Santa Fe Province. He was also dedicated to agriculture, he owned land in the villages of Areco and Colón.

References

External links 

 Argentina, National Census, 1869
 Argentina, National Census, 1895

1845 births
1925 deaths
Argentine people of Irish descent
People from Buenos Aires Province
Politicians from Buenos Aires